Ding-Yu Peng is a professor of Chemical Engineering at the University of Saskatchewan.
Under the direction of Donald B. Robinson, Peng introduced a two-parameter cubic equation of state now known as the Peng–Robinson equation of state during the 1970s while a research engineer.

Early life

Ding-Yu Peng was born in China sometime in 1943.

Education

Peng completed a degree in chemical engineering at the National Taiwan University in 1966. He studied for one year at Syracuse University during 1968-1969. Subsequently, he followed Leonard I. Stiel to the University of Missouri and obtained his PhD. in chemical engineering in 1973.

Work under Robinson

In late 1974, while working as a post-doctoral fellow under Robinson, the Natural Gas Processors Association requested a better gas model than was available at that time. Work on the Peng–Robinson equation of state was completed in 1975, and the results were published the following year.

Teaching

Peng taught thermodynamics and mass transfer at the University of Saskatchewan. He has been a Professor Emeritus since July 2021.

Awards

Peng earned a Doctor of Science degree in 2005. He was also the recipient of the 2006 Donald L. Katz Award by the Gas Processors Association. The award is for "outstanding accomplishments in gas processing research, and for excellence in engineering education."

References

Academic staff of the University of Saskatchewan
Taiwanese chemical engineers
National Taiwan University alumni
1943 births
Living people
Syracuse University alumni
University of Missouri alumni
Taiwanese expatriates in Canada
Taiwanese expatriates in the United States